New York City's 8th City Council district is one of 51 districts in the New York City Council. It has been represented by Democrat Diana Ayala since 2018, succeeding fellow Democrat and former Council Speaker Melissa Mark-Viverito.

Geography
District 8 covers several majority-Hispanic neighborhoods in northern Manhattan and the South Bronx, including Mott Haven, Port Morris, most of East Harlem, and parts of Highbridge, Concourse, and Longwood. Randalls and Wards Islands are also a part of the district.

The district overlaps with Manhattan Community Board 11 and Bronx Community Boards 1, 2, and 4, and with New York's 12th, 13th, and 15th congressional districts. It also overlaps with the 29th, 30th, and 32nd districts of the New York State Senate, and with the 68th, 77th, 84th, and 85th districts of the New York State Assembly.

The district is only one of two in the City Council to span two different boroughs, the other being the 34th district in Brooklyn and Queens. Although the 8th district's population is split evenly across Manhattan and the Bronx, its five most recent councilmembers have all hailed from Manhattan.

Recent election results

2021
In 2019, voters in New York City approved Ballot Question 1, which implemented ranked-choice voting in all local elections. Under the new system, voters have the option to rank up to five candidates for every local office. Voters whose first-choice candidates fare poorly will have their votes redistributed to other candidates in their ranking until one candidate surpasses the 50 percent threshold. If one candidate surpasses 50 percent in first-choice votes, then ranked-choice tabulations will not occur.

2017

2013

References

New York City Council districts